Douvaine is a commune in the Haute-Savoie department in the Auvergne-Rhône-Alpes region in south-eastern France.

Location 
Located on the old Roman way, now the National Road 5, Douvaine is part of the Canton of Sciez that includes 25 communes located in the Bas-Chablais area.

Population

See also 
Communes of the Haute-Savoie department

References

Communes of Haute-Savoie